Brian Allen (born April 20, 1980) is a former American football running back. He played at Stanford University from 1998 to 2001 and surpassed 2,100 yards in rushing during his collegiate career. Allen graduated from Stanford University in 2002 and is currently the 10th-leading rusher in Stanford football history. He was drafted in the sixth round of the 2002 NFL Draft. After his NFL career, Allen worked as a corporate paralegal at Wilson Sonsini Goodrich & Rosati and as an investment banking analyst at WR Hambrecht + Co. At WR Hambrecht + Co, Allen worked on several transactions during his tenure, the most notable being the United Football League with William Hambrecht (Hambrecht & Quist). Allen currently resides in the Portland, Oregon metro area with his wife and two children. Allen works for Fidelity Investments as a financial consultant and in his free time, Allen is an avid fitness guru.

References

External links
ESPN profile
KFFL.com profile
USA Today profile
Champion Boot Camps

1980 births
Living people
People from Ontario, California
Sportspeople from San Bernardino County, California
Players of American football from California
American football running backs
Stanford Cardinal football players
Indianapolis Colts players
San Francisco 49ers players